Madoff: The Monster of Wall Street is a 2023 American true crime documentary series directed by Joe Berlinger and based in part on the 2021 book Madoff Talks by Jim Campbell. The four-part series was produced by RadicalMedia in association with Third Eye Motion Picture Company for the streaming service Netflix and released in its entirety on January 4, 2023. It details how Bernie Madoff rose to power and, using former employees, investigators, journalists, victims, whistleblowers, and Madoff video depositions, unpacks the world's biggest Ponzi scheme while also laying blame on the many who saw an abundance of red flags but decided to shrug them off and look the other way.

Backstory 
While discussing the documentary series in an interview with journalist Hari Sreenivasan on the American global affairs television program Amanpour & Company, Berlinger stated, "[W]hat I really wanted to emphasize is the utter failure of the regulators." When asked about the never-before-seen footage of Madoff, he explained that it was graciously offered to him during an interview he did with attorney Helen Chaitman, who had deposed Madoff while representing many of the victims in clawback lawsuits.

Plot summaries

A Liar, Not a Failure 
The documentary series begins with Madoff's arrest and a historical context of his early life, including what led to his absolute determination not to be a failure like his father. It discusses how he began his career in penny stock trades and built a profitable side business that provided clients with impressive returns. With his brother Peter, they were able to pioneer computerized trading and the consolidation of off-the-exchange markets which eventually led to the formation of NASDAQ for which he would be on the Board of Governors.

Don't Ask, Don't Tell 
In the second episode, we see the stark differences between the modern and pristine operation on the 19th floor of the Lipstick Building and what was transpiring on the relic and shopworn 17th floor, where Madoff was running his investment advisory business and where most of the fraud was orchestrated, and from where Madoff's empire branched into the hedge fund business, which began drawing unwanted scrutiny.

In his disposition, Madoff confirms the names of four significant investors, including Jeffry Picower, a shadowy and long-time client, dating back 30 years. Although Madoff never confronted Picower or discussed the matter with him, it was suspected he knew what was going on and, because of this, had the power to torment and extort Madoff while profiting substantially from his Ponzi scheme.

See No Evil 
In the third episode, the focus shifts on how Madoff's numbers were unrealistic, and despite his competitors alerting the U.S. Securities and Exchange Commission, the agency, enamored by Madoff's reputation, chose to ignore all the red flags, preferring instead to look the other way and allow Madoff to continue.

The Price of Trust 
In the final episode, we hear how employees on the 17th floor were rewarded, and we see Madoff's $65 billion Ponzi scheme quickly collapses as investors begin to withdraw their money during the 2008 Financial Crisis. We see how Madoff's sons attempt to stop their father from writing bonus cheques for long-time investors, faithful employees, and extended family to help cushion the blow.  Madoff confesses to the Ponzi scheme, and the FBI arrests him.

After pleading guilty, Madoff is sentenced to 150 years in prison. Two years after learning of the Ponzi scheme, his eldest son Mark is found hanging from a pipe, dead of an apparent suicide. His other son dies of lymphoma six years later.

Cast

Production 
Shooting for the series was done on stage rather than in traditional office space, which provided the crew with the means to more easily control the set when transitioning between scenes filmed in daylight and those created at night, all while using continuous shots. Interviews with some of Madoff's victims were done off-set in actual locations. During the 30 to 40 days of shooting spread over a few months, crew sizes varied from four to one hundred depending on the stage of production.

Netflix announced the series in October 2021 and that it would be made by filmmaker Joe Berlinger and would include access to "victims, whistleblowers, investigators, and archives," and that some of it would be based on Jim Campbell's 2021 book Madoff Talks: Uncovering the Untold Story Behind the Most Notorious Ponzi Scheme in History. Berlinger would later reveal that the series would include footage of Madoff's video depositions.

Release 
The four-part series, Madoff: The Monster of Wall Street, began streaming in its entirety on Netflix on January 4, 2023.

The soundtrack, was released a week in advance by composer Serj Tankian. The album, entitled Madoff: The Monster of Wall Street (Soundtrack from the Netflix Series), includes 27 musical compositions from the series and was made available to stream on all major digital music platforms.

Reception 
Madoff: The Monster of Wall Street was generally well received. In The Wall Street Journal, John Anderson writes, "Among Mr. Berlinger’s accomplishments in The Monster of Wall Street is not making the Madoff story remotely romantic, or even a parable, while at the same time putting blood in its veins." Brian Tallerico, editor of RogerEbert.com posts, "It’s not as flashy as his serial killer exposes, but it does take a very complex issue and unpack it in a way that’s easy to follow." In The Guardian, critic Chitra Ramaswamy includes, "Joe Berlinger’s pacy four-parter treats the jaw-dropping story as a financial thriller, which makes sense." Nick Schager, entertainment critic for The Daily Beast, finds that "the docuseries is a stinting evisceration of a man and a culture that cared more about dollar signs than rules, ethics, or even loved ones."

On the Netflix Top 10 Most Viewed list, the series premiered at number two and was listed in the Top 10 in TV in twenty countries in the first week of 2023.

See also

References

External links
 
 

2023 American television series debuts
2023 American television series endings
2020s American documentary television series
Documentary television series about crime in the United States
English-language Netflix original programming
Netflix original documentary television series
Television series based on actual events
Madoff investment scandal